José Carlos "Zlatan" Fernández Piedra (born 14 May 1983 in Trujillo, Peru) is a Peruvian footballer who plays as a center forward for Peruvian Primera División club Carlos A. Mannucci.

He is nicknamed "Zlatan" because of his physical resemblance to Swedish footballer Zlatan Ibrahimović.

Club career
Fernández began his playing career in early 2000 with local club Defensor Taller de Laredo. Then in 2002 he transferred to Sport Coopsol Trujillo. Fernández made his official debut in the Torneo Descentralizado on 22 September 2002 in round 11 of the 2002 Torneo Clausura. His debut match was played at home in the Mansiche Stadium against Coronel Bolognesi, which ended in a 4–0 loss for Coopsol Trujillo.
José Carlos scored his first official goal in the Descentralizado on 1 December 2002 in a league match against Alianza Atlético in round 21 of the Clausura season. He scored in the 80th minute, but it was not enough as Alianza Atlético won 4–2 in Trujillo. He finished his first season in the top-flight with 15 appearances and 3 goals. However, Coopsol Trujillo finished in 12th place and were relegated to the Copa Perú division.

Then in 2003 he joined Lima based club Sport Coopsol, which at the time was participating in the Peruvian Second Division. There he would win his first silverware as he helped Sport Coopsol win the 2003 Peruvian Second Division championship. Sport Coopsol won promotion to the First Division but instead decided to sell their spot to newly formed club Club Deportivo Universidad de San Martín de Porres. As a result, Fernández transferred to Universidad San Martín for the 2004 Torneo Descentralizado season.

He then went on to have stints at 4 other Peruvian clubs: Club Deportivo Universidad César Vallejo, FBC Melgar, Coronel Bolognesi, and Cienciano. He spent two years playing in Europe. First with the Ukrainian team FC Chornomorets Odessa, where he stayed 4 months, playing in 2 games and totaling 19 minutes. Then on 30 May 2008, Fernández signed a contract with Cercle Brugge, which ended on 10 February 2009. It was announced at the same time that Fernández moved back to his home country, to play for Alianza Lima. He played in the 2012 Copa Libertadores and scored decisive goals for his club.

Finally, in October he played for the Argentine club Argentinos Juniors. Unfortunately he didn't make any goal because he had a serious injury that left him for several months. In 2013, he moved to the Peruvian team Sporting Cristal to play the 2013 Copa Libertadores and Peruvian First Division.

International career

International goals

Honours

Club 
 Sport Coopsol:
 Peruvian Second Division: 2003

Carlos A. Mannucci
 Copa Bicentenario; Runner Up 2021

References

External links
 

1983 births
Living people
People from Trujillo, Peru
Peruvian footballers
Peru international footballers
Peruvian expatriate footballers
Association football forwards
Sport Coopsol Trujillo footballers
Club Deportivo Universidad de San Martín de Porres players
Club Deportivo Universidad César Vallejo footballers
FBC Melgar footballers
Coronel Bolognesi footballers
Cienciano footballers
FC Chornomorets Odesa players
Cercle Brugge K.S.V. players
Club Alianza Lima footballers
S.D. Quito footballers
Argentinos Juniors footballers
Sporting Cristal footballers
Real Garcilaso footballers
Sport Huancayo footballers
Peruvian Primera División players
Ukrainian Premier League players
Belgian Pro League players
Expatriate footballers in Ukraine
Expatriate footballers in Belgium
Expatriate footballers in Ecuador
Expatriate footballers in Argentina
Peruvian expatriate sportspeople in Ukraine
Peruvian expatriate sportspeople in Belgium
Peruvian expatriate sportspeople in Ecuador
Peruvian expatriate sportspeople in Argentina